Action at Springfield, also known as the Battle of First Springfield, was a battle of the American Civil War that took place on October 25, 1861, in Greene County, Missouri. It was the only Union victory in southwestern Missouri in 1861.

Prelude 
Maj. Gen. John C. Frémont commanded the Union Department of the West, with headquarters in St. Louis. He formulated a plan to clear Confederate forces from the state, and then, if possible, carry the war into Arkansas and Louisiana. His force left St. Louis on October 7, 1861; it eventually numbered more than 20,000. He had 5,000 cavalry, which included Maj. Frank J. White's Prairie Scouts and Frémont's Body Guards under Maj. Charles Zagonyi. Maj. White became ill and turned his command over to Zagonyi. These two units scouted in front of the army.

By December, the army had advanced into southwest Missouri. Opposing them was the main body of the pro-Confederate Missouri State Guard under Major General Sterling Price, at Springfield, Missouri.

With his force heavily outnumbered, Price withdrew from Springfield. Other MSG forces organizing nearby attempted to link up with Price's army at Springfield, only to find the place had already been abandoned.

Opposing forces

Union 
 Fremont's Bodyguards: Major Charles Zagonyi
 Major Frank White's Prairie Scouts

Confederate 
 Missouri State Guard: Colonel Julian Frazier

Battle 

As Frémont neared Springfield, the local state guard commander, Colonel Julian Frazier, sent out requests to nearby localities for additional troops. Frémont camped on the Pomme de Terre River, near Bolivar, Missouri. Zagonyi's scouting column, though, continued on to Springfield, and Frazier's mixed force of 1,000 to 1,500 infantry and cavalry prepared to meet it.

Zagonyi's combined force of 326 men approached Springfield on the Mt. Vernon Road.  Frazier set up an ambush along the road that Zagonyi traveled.  Zagonyi ordered a charge from the timbered bottomland of today's Jordan Creek, exhorting his men with "We have been called holiday warriors for the pavements of St. Louis...Let the watchword be 'Fremont and the Union.'"    After three charges the Confederates fled in disorder. Zagonyi's men continued into town, hailed Federal sympathizers and released Union prisoners, tore down the Confederate flag flying over the courthouse and hoisted Union colors. Leery of a Confederate counterattack, Zagonyi departed Springfield before night, but Frémont's army returned, in force, a few days later and set up camp in the town.

Casualties 
Union casualties were reported as 15 killed, 27 wounded, and 10 missing/captured for Fremont's Body Guard, and 33 killed, wounded and missing/captured for White's command, for a total of 85. Confederate casualties are unknown but estimated as 133.

Aftermath 
In mid-November, after Frémont was sacked and replaced by Maj. Gen. David Hunter, the Federals evacuated Springfield and withdrew to Sedalia and Rolla. Federal troops reoccupied Springfield in early 1862 and it was a Union stronghold from then on. This small engagement was the only Union victory in Southwestern Missouri in 1861.

Notes

References 
 Banasik, Michael E., Confederate Tales of the War in the Trans-Mississippi Part One: 1861, 2010
 Miller, Robert E., "Zagonyi", Missouri Historical Review, October, 1982, Vol. 76, No. 2 
 National Park Service battle description
 Civil War Sites Advisory Committee Report Update and Resurvey
 Roll of Honor of Captain Foley's 5th Independent Company Ohio Volunteer Cavalry aka "Fremont's Bodyguard" pp. 147–152; 566

1861 in the American Civil War
1861 in Missouri
Springfield I
Springfield I
Springfield I
History of Greene County, Missouri
History of Springfield, Missouri
October 1861 events
Springfield I